MMA Grand Prix, often abbreviated MMA GP, is a professional mixed martial arts promotion based in Vitry-sur-Seine, Val-de-Marne, France.

History
MMA Grand Prix was created in 2020, upon the legalization of MMA's internationally accepted rules (which include ground strikes) by the French government. Their first card was held on 8 October of that year, in presence of French Minister of Sports Roxana Maracineanu. It was the first organization to present MMA in France under its complete ruleset. It is sanctioned by the French Mixed Martial Arts Federation, a subsidiary of the French Boxing Federation, which has been accredited by the Ministry of Sports to regulate the activity.

Co-founder Éric Konako Faubert is a London-based promoter for Muay Thai Grand Prix, an international thai boxing promotion, with whom MMA Grand Prix shares common branding.

The promotion's first card held outside of the Paris region, The Last of the Kings in Le Havre, featured a comeback fight from veteran kickboxer turned mixed martial artist Jérome Le Banner. It served as a tribute to Le Banner's training partner and Le Havre mayor Édouard Philippe who, during his term as prime minister, was responsible for the legalization of French MMA. It was Le Banner's first MMA fight outside of Japan.

Notable fighters
 Cédric Doumbé
 Karim Ghajji
 Jérome Le Banner
 Mickaël Lebout
 :fr:Laetitia Blot

Media
Select MMA GP shows, including the company's inaugural card, have aired on the UFC Fight Pass.
In May 2022, the promotion inked its first television deal with Sport en France. However, French media authority CSA still bans MMA broadcasts before 10:30 pm, forcing some fights to be shown on tape delay. MMA GP made its premium TV debut with a 17 December 2022 card from Bordeaux, which was broadcast on RMC Sport 2.

References

External links 
 Official website
 MMA Grand Prix at Sherdog

Mixed martial arts organizations
Mixed martial arts television shows
Sports organizations established in 2020
2020 establishments in France